Smyrna Baptist Church, also known as Kirkland Church, is a historic Baptist church located near Allendale, Allendale County, South Carolina. It was built in 1827, and is a one-story, meeting house style frame structure with a hipped roof.  The front facade features a central Palladian window flanked by balancing nine-paneled entrance doors.  A cemetery surrounds the church.

Dr. William Erwin, the original owner of Erwinton, his wife and sister-in-law were all excommunicated from Kirkland Church in 1833 for their affiliation with other denominations. They then formed the second Christian congregation, the Disciples of Christ, in South Carolina. They held weekly meetings at Erwinton until 1835 when the present meeting house was completed and dedicated as Antioch Christian Church.

It was added to the National Register of Historic Places in 1976.

References

Baptist churches in South Carolina
Churches on the National Register of Historic Places in South Carolina
Churches completed in 1827
19th-century Baptist churches in the United States
Buildings and structures in Allendale County, South Carolina
National Register of Historic Places in Allendale County, South Carolina
1827 establishments in South Carolina